is a Japanese tokusatsu drama, the 31st entry of Toei Company's Kamen Rider franchise, and the second series to debut during the Reiwa period. The series premiered on September 6, 2020, joining Mashin Sentai Kiramager, and later, Kikai Sentai Zenkaiger in the Super Hero Time line-up after the finale of Kamen Rider Zero-One before being succeeded by Kamen Rider Revice on September 5, 2021. The series is notable for its use of a fantasy setting, along with its storybook theming.

Premise

The human world collides with a realm of fairy tales called Wonder World due to a conflict over the Almighty Book – a legendary artifact of unparalleled power as a trio of monsters called the Megids mount a failed attempt to claim it and create more of their kind. Two millennia later however, the Dark Swordsman Hayato Fukamiya, aka Kamen Rider Calibur, betrayed his comrades upon learning a horrible truth and was reportedly killed by the Flame Swordsman, Daichi Kamijo, with a girl named Luna being an apparent causality of their fight. Daichi gave his Wonder Ride Book to a boy named Touma Kamiyama before leaving his sword behind.

Becoming a novelist and bookstore owner a further fifteen years later, Touma's attempt to stop a Megid attack causes him to inherit Kamijo's title as Kamen Rider Saber and he resolves to end the conflict after being recruited by the Water Swordsman, Rintaro Shindo, of an organization of swordsmen called the Sword of Logos. Among the other swordsmen Touma meets while recovering both his memories and lost Wonder Ride Books is his childhood friend, Kento Fukamiya, who wishes to understand his father's actions after Calibur resurfaces as the Megids' ally.

Production
The Kamen Rider Saber trademark was registered by Toei on May 29, 2020.

On 29 July 2020, Kamen Rider Saber was officially announced during a press conference alongside its cast, during which time it was announced that the show is planned to feature at least 10 Riders over the course of the series. Along with the eponymous character, five other confirmed Riders at the time were Blades, Espada, Buster, Kenzan, and Calibur. Following the series premiere, additional Riders Slash, Falchion, Saikou, Sabela, Durandal, Solomon, and Storious eventually join the cast.

The opening theme song is performed by the band Tokyo Ska Paradise Orchestra collaborating with the band Alexandros' Yoohei Kawakami, who provides the vocals. Tokyo Ska Paradise Orchestra also performs the ending theme song, and Kinichi Motegi, the band's drummer, provides the vocals.

Episodes

Films

The Phoenix Swordsman and the Book of Ruin
 was released on December 18, 2020, double billed with Kamen Rider Zero-One the Movie: Real×Time. Actor Masashi Taniguchi portrayed the film's main antagonist, Bahato, who eventually returned in the series as a recurring character. The events of the film take place between episodes 9–11.

Super Hero Senki
 
 is a crossover film released on July 22, 2021, starring the casts from Saber and Kikai Sentai Zenkaiger, as well as featuring characters from past entries of the franchises involved. The film is part of the celebrations for both the 50th anniversary of the Kamen Rider franchise and the 45th anniversary of the Super Sentai franchise, and serves as the final crossover between them. Actors Fuku Suzuki and Ayumi Tanida portrayed Shotaro Ishinomori and the film's main antagonist, Asmodeus, respectively. Moreover, Kenjirō Ishimaru of Kamen Rider Den-O; Takashi Ukaji of Kamen Rider OOO; So Okuno of Kamen Rider Zi-O; Fumiya Takahashi of Kamen Rider Zero-One; Shogo Suzuki of Samurai Sentai Shinkenger; Atomu Mizuishi of Mashin Sentai Kiramager; and Hiroshi Fujioka of Kamen Rider  (1971 - 1973) reprised their respective roles while Naoya Makoto of Himitsu Sentai Gorenger; Toshihiko Seki, Kōji Yusa, Masaki Terasoma, and Kenichi Suzumura of Kamen Rider Den-O; Tetsu Inada of Tokusou Sentai Dekaranger; M·A·O and Hiroshi Kamiya of Uchu Sentai Kyuranger; and Rikiya Koyama of Kamen Rider Zi-O reprised their respective voice roles. Additionally, the two main characters of Kamen Rider Revice made their first appearances and a special film for the series was double billed with Super Hero Senki. The events of the film take place after the two-part Movie Release Commemorative Combo Special, which itself takes place between episodes 39 and 40.

Beyond Generations
 is a crossover film released on December 17, 2021, starring the casts of Saber and Kamen Rider Revice. The film will also feature a new Kamen Rider from a possible future in the year 2071, 100 years after the debut of the first Kamen Rider television series. Additionally, actors Akiyoshi Nakao and Arata Furuta portrayed the film's guest characters and Hiroshi Fujioka's son, Maito, portrayed Takeshi Hongo's younger self.

Web-exclusive series
 is a web-exclusive series released on Telasa on November 8, 2020. It comprises four episodes and focuses on Rintaro Shindo, Kento Fukamiya, Ryo Ogami, Ren Akamichi, and Tetsuo Daishinji.
Chapter 8.5: 
The Other Side of Chapter 9: 
Behind the Chapter 13: 
Chapter 15.5: 
 is a web-exclusive animated short series released on Toei Tokusatsu Fan Club on February 1, 2021.

Kamen Rider Saber × Ghost is a web-exclusive series of Toei Tokusatsu Fan Club serves as a crossover between Saber and Kamen Rider Ghost, with Shun Nishime and Mio Kudo reprising their respective roles as Takeru Tenkūji and Kanon Fukami: The events of the series take place between episodes 38 and 39.
 is the titular first entry of the web-series released on May 23, 2021, with Sotaro returning to reprise his role as Javel.
 is a sequel to the titular first entry of the web-series released on June 27, 2021, with Ryosuke Yamamoto returning to reprise his role as Makoto Fukami.
 is a web-exclusive special released on Toei Tokusatsu Fan Club on November 20, 2022. The events of the special take place a year after the end of the main series.

DVD and Blu-ray-exclusive series
 is included as part of the Blu-ray releases of Kamen Rider Saber. This storyline focuses on the lives of three known bearers of the Kamen Rider Calibur title:
Part 1 serves as a prequel to the main series and focuses on Hayato Fukamiya and Daichi Kamijo.
Part 2 takes place during episodes 17–35, and focuses on Kento Fukamiya. It was released on August 4, 2021.
 is Televi-Kuns .

V-Cinema
 is a V-Cinema release which received a limited theatrical release on January 28, 2022, followed by its DVD and Blu-ray release on May 11, 2022. The events of the V-Cinema take place eight years after the end of the main series. The V-Cinema was written by Takuro Fukuda and directed by Kazuya Kamihoriuchi. The theme song is "Bittersweet" performed by Asuka Kawazu, Shuichiro Naito, Takaya Yamaguchi, and Ryo Aoki.

Manga
 is a manga adaptation that focuses on Ryo Ogami's past, including his high school days two decades prior and the birth of his son, Sora, six years after Daichi Kamijo defeated Hayato Fukamiya. The manga is written by Kaori Kaneko and illustrated by Keitarō Kumatsuki, and was serialized on Toei Tokusatsu Fan Club from February 28, 2021, to May 30, 2021. Each arc of the manga consists of three chapters.

Cast

Main
 : 
 : 
 : 
 : 
 : 
 : 
 : 
 : 
 : 
 : 
 , : 
 : 
 : 
 : 
 :  (Child),  (Adult)
 : 
 : 
 : 
 , Another Sophia, Priestess: 
 : 
 : 
 : 
 Seiken Rider System Singing Voice: 
 Kamen Rider Sabela's Equipment Voice: 
 Narration, Seiken Rider System Speaking Voice, Wonder Ride Books Voice:

Guest cast

 : 
 : 
 : 
 Men (8): , 
 : 
 Married couple (16): , 
 : 
 : 
 : 
 : 
 : 
 : 
 Revice Equipment Voice (Special Issue):

Theme songs
Opening theme

Lyrics: Atsushi Yanaka
Composition: Tsuyoshi Kawakami
Artist & Arrangement: Tokyo Ska Paradise Orchestra
Vocals & Lyrics (English Translation): Yoohei Kawakami
Episodes 1 and 47 do not feature the show's opening sequence. This song is used as an insert song in episodes 1, 10, 15, 27, and 47.
Ending theme

Lyrics: Atsushi Yanaka
Composition: Takashi Kato
Artist & Arrangement: Tokyo Ska Paradise Orchestra
Vocals: Kinichi Motegi
Episodes 15, 44, and 47 and Special Issue do not feature the show's ending sequence.
Insert themes
"Rewrite the story"
Lyrics: Shoko Fujibayashi
Composition: tatsuo
Artist: Shuichiro Naito, Takaya Yamaguchi, & Ryo Aoki
Episodes: 38-40
"Will save us"
Lyrics: Shio Watanabe, Kazuya Kamihoriuchi
Composition: Shuhei Naruse
Artist: Asuka Kawazu
Episodes: 43
"The story never ends"
Lyrics: Shoko Fujibayashi
Composition: Kousuke Yamashita
Artist: Rina Chinen
Episodes: 44
"BOOK OF POWER"
Lyrics: Shoko Fujibayashi
Composition: tatsuo
Artist: Masanori Kobayashi (WAЯROCK)
Episodes: 45
An instrumental version of this song is used.
"Timeless Story"
Lyrics: Isa Takinoo
Composition: Kousuke Yamashita
Artist: Utabito Zanmai Samady
Episodes: 45, 47

Notes

References

External links
Official website at TV Asahi 
Official website at Kamen Rider Web 

Official website for Kamen Rider Saber: Trio of Deep Sin 

2020 Japanese television series debuts
2021 Japanese television series endings
Saber
TV Asahi original programming
Japanese fantasy television series
Japanese supernatural television series
Fictional knights
Television series about monsters
Dark fantasy television series